Persicaria amphibia (syn. Polygonum amphibium) is a species of flowering plant in the knotweed family known by several common names, including longroot smartweed, water knotweed, water smartweed, and amphibious bistort.  It is native to much of North America, Asia, Europe, and parts of Africa, and it grows elsewhere as an introduced species and sometimes a noxious weed.

Distribution and habitat
Persicaria amphibia is native to a large area across the northern hemisphere, including Europe, Asia, North America, and parts of Africa. It has been introduced elsewhere, such as South America and other parts of Africa.

It grows in many types of wet habitat, such as ponds, streams, and marshes. It is a rhizomatous perennial herb which takes a variety of forms and is quite variable in morphology. It may be an aquatic plant, growing submerged or floating in water bodies, it may grow in muddy and wet areas which are periodically inundated, and it may grow in moist spots on land, such as in meadows.

Dry-land and fully aquatic plants are sometimes considered different named varieties of the species.

Description
Persicaria amphibia produces a thick stem from its rhizome. The stem may creep, float, or grow erect, rooting at stem nodes that come in contact with moist substrate. Stems are known to reach 3 meters (10 feet) long in aquatic individuals. The stems are ribbed and may be hairless to quite hairy in texture.

Leaves are lance-shaped or take various other shapes and are borne on petioles. They may be over 30 centimeters (1 foot) in length. The inflorescence is a dense terminal cluster of many five-lobed pink flowers.

Plants may have bisexual or unisexual flowers, with some plants bearing only male or only female flowers.

Varieties
Three varieties are generally recognized, though some authorities consider P. a. var. emersa a distinct species, Persicaria coccinea.

 P. a. var. emersa (longroot smartweed) – Plants palustrine, usually with emergent leafy stems; ocreae never with flared apices; aerial leaves petiolate with acuminate tips; inflorescence spikes terminal, usually 2 (unequal), > 4 cm long.
In North America, P. a. var. stipulacea does not grow south of the Laurentide Ice Sheet except in the mountain west and Mexico.
P. a. var. amphibia – European

Uses
Various parts of this plant were used by several Native American groups as medicinal remedies and sometimes as food.

References

amphibia
Flora of North America
Flora of Europe
Flora of Asia
Plants described in 1753
Taxa named by Carl Linnaeus
Plants used in Native American cuisine
Plants used in traditional Native American medicine